Xichong may refer to:

Xichong, Shenzhen, scenic spot in Longgang District, Shenzhen, China
Xichong County, county in Nanchong, Sichuan, China